Imilian Șerbănică (born 24 July 1956) is a Romanian former professional footballer who played as a midfielder for teams such as Autobuzul București, Sportul Studențesc or FCM Brașov, among others. After retirement, Șerbănică started his football manager career and led from the technical bench, teams such as Sportul Studențesc, Fulgerul Bragadiru, Callatis Mangalia or Dunărea Giurgiu, currently being the youth center manager of Liga I side Academica Clinceni.

Honours

Player
Sportul Studențesc
Cupa României: Runner-up 1978–79
Balkans Cup: 1979–80
Balkans Cup: Runner-up 1976

Manager
Fulgerul Bragadiru
Divizia C: 1999–2000

References

External links
 
 

1956 births
Living people
Footballers from Bucharest
Romanian footballers
Association football midfielders
Liga I players
FC Politehnica Iași (1945) players
FC Sportul Studențesc București players
FC Brașov (1936) players
Liga II players
AFC Rocar București players
FC UTA Arad players
Romanian football managers
FC Sportul Studențesc București managers
AFC Dacia Unirea Brăila managers